
Aleksandrów County is a unit of territorial administration and local government (powiat) in Kuyavian-Pomeranian Voivodeship, north-central Poland. It came into being on January 1, 1999, as a result of the Polish local government reforms passed in 1998.

As of 2010 its total population is 55,352, out of which the population of Aleksandrów Kujawski is 12,359, that of Ciechocinek is 10,855, that of Nieszawa is 2,012, and the rural population is 29,969.

Neighbouring counties
Aleksandrów County is bordered by Toruń County to the north, Lipno County to the east, Włocławek County to the south-east, Radziejów County to the south and Inowrocław County to the west.

Administrative division
The county is subdivided into nine gminas (three urban and six rural). These are listed in the following table, in descending order of population.

References
 Polish official population figures 2019

 
Land counties of Kuyavian-Pomeranian Voivodeship